Football Club Koper, commonly referred to as FC Koper or simply Koper, is a Slovenian football club based in Koper that competes in the Slovenian PrvaLiga, the top flight of Slovenian football. The club was founded in 1920. Koper is one of five Slovenian clubs that managed to win all three domestic trophies (league, cup and supercup).

The club's home ground is Bonifika Stadium, which has a capacity of 4,047 seats.

History
The club was formed as Circolo sportivo Capodistria in 1920. The team was made up of students, workers and fishermen. Its colours were black and white. In 1928, the club was renamed as Unione sportiva Capodistriana. Six years later, the club was renamed as Libertas.

After World War II, the club became part of a larger sports association and renamed as Aurora. By 1948, there were five clubs operating in the Koper area: Aurora, Meduza, Partizan, Edilit, and Adria. In 1955, Aurora and Meduza merged, creating NK Koper. The club played under this name in different Yugoslav leagues until 1991 and was one of the most successful Slovenian clubs. After Slovenia's independence, the club played in the Slovenian PrvaLiga. At the beginning of the 1990s, the club was achieving mid-table success. By the end of the 1990s, the club had been relegated to the second division twice, had serious financial problems, and renamed as FC Koper. With the advent of the new millennium, Koper consistently achieved positions in the upper half of the table. In 2002, they competed in the 2002 UEFA Intertoto Cup, their first international competition. Two years of mid-table anonymity and significant financial difficulties followed, in part because the former owner, Georg Suban, left substantial debts to the club and took half of the team with him when he moved to the other Slovenian PrvaLiga team, Mura.

The fans took control of the club and tried to improve its finances to save it from going bankrupt like three other major Slovenian clubs (Olimpija, Mura and Ljubljana), with reasonable success. In the 2005–06 season, Mladen Rudonja returned to the club and brought with him the Serbian-American businessman Milan Mandarić, who paid off all the remaining debts. After the first half of the season, before the arrival of the new patron, Koper was battling against relegation, but in the second part of the season, with a new coach, Milivoj Bračun, the club started an unbeaten run that led them to reach the third place in the Slovenian PrvaLiga and to win the Slovenian Cup for the first time. This also qualified the team to play in the UEFA Cup qualifying rounds in the 2006–07 season. The following seasons were more difficult, with the club narrowly avoiding relegation in 2009. In the 2009–10 season, the team was expanded and, under the leadership of veteran player Miran Pavlin, eventually won the Slovenian PrvaLiga championship for the first time, securing a place in the UEFA Champions League qualifiers, where they were defeated by Dinamo Zagreb 5–4 on aggregate (1–5, 3–0). In the aftermath, Pavlin left the club.

Following the 2016–17 season, Koper failed to obtain a competition licence and was excluded from the Slovenian top division.

Name changes
1920: Formed as Circolo sportivo Capodistria
1928: Renamed as Unione sportiva Capodistriana
1946: Renamed as Aurora Koper
1955: Fusion from Aurora Koper and Meduza Koper to NK Koper
1990: Renamed as NK Koper Capodistria
2002: Renamed as FC Koper
2003: Renamed as FC Anet Koper
2008: Renamed as FC Luka Koper
2017: Renamed as FC Koper

Stadium

Bonifika Stadium is the team's home ground, which is named after the area where it is situated in the town of Koper. The stadium was built in 1948. In 2010 the stadium underwent a major reconstruction and its current capacity is 4,047 seats.

Current squad

Honours

Yugoslavia
League
 Slovenian Republic League (third tier in Yugoslavia)
 Winners: 1984–85, 1987–88
 Runners-up: 1986–87

Cup
 Slovenian Republic Cup
 Winners: 1989–90, 1990–91
 Runners-up: 1988–89

Slovenia
League
 Slovenian First League
 Winners: 2009–10
 Runners-up: 2007–08, 2013–14, 2021–22
Slovenian Second League
 Winners: 1999–2000
 Runners-up: 1997–98
Slovenian Third League
 Winners: 2018–19
Littoral League (fourth tier)
 Winners: 2017–18

Cup
Slovenian Cup
 Winners: 2005–06, 2006–07, 2014–15, 2021–22
 Runners-up: 2008–09
Slovenian Supercup
 Winners: 2010, 2015
 Runners-up: 2007
MNZ Koper Cup
 Winners: 2017–18, 2018–19

Domestic league and cup results

In Yugoslavia

In Slovenia

*Best results are highlighted.

Koper in UEFA competitions
All results (home and away) list Koper's goal tally first.

Notes
 1Q: First qualifying round
 2Q: Second qualifying round
 1R: First round
 2R: Second round
 3R: Third round
 SF: Semi-final

References

External links
Official FC Koper website 
Unofficial NK Koper website 
PrvaLiga profile 
Soccerway profile

 
1920 establishments in Slovenia
Association football clubs established in 1920
Football clubs in Slovenia
Football clubs in Yugoslavia
Sport in Koper